The 2015 Rugby World Cup warm-up matches were a series of rugby union test matches that took place in August and September 2015, as the 20 competing teams prepared for the 2015 Rugby World Cup.

For most teams, their preparation kicked off in August after various training camps before the squad announcement deadline date of 31 August. Uruguay were the first to begin their warm-up campaign at the start of August, playing three tests: first against an Argentina XV, and then a two-test series against Japan, before playing an uncapped match against a Basque Selection team. Wales and reigning Six Nations champions Ireland followed suit a week later, with the first game of a home and away series, after which Wales played Italy, just days after they announced their final World Cup team. Hosts England played a home and away test series against France before they played Ireland in London. Both Ireland and France played Scotland at home, while Scotland played a home and away test series against the Italians.

With a reduced 2015 Rugby Championship, participants Argentina hosted South Africa, while reigning World Cup champions New Zealand hosted Australia for the second Bledisloe Cup match of 2015. En route to the World Cup, the Wallabies stopped off in the United States to play their national team for the first time on American soil since 1976. The United States also hosted English club side Harlequins, while they also faced Canada in Ottawa. Canada additionally hosted Pro12 champions Glasgow Warriors, before they faced Georgia and Fiji at a neutral venue in the United Kingdom, which also hosted Georgia's encounter with Japan. Glasgow's Scottish counterparts Edinburgh, faced Romania, who also took on Tonga for just their second time in their history.

Aside from Harlequins, other English clubs faced international opposition, when Newcastle Falcons faced Georgia, Leicester Tigers faced Argentina, Yorkshire Carnegie played Romania and Wasps hosted Samoa. Samoa were the first international rugby union team to play at the Olympic Stadium in London, when they faced the Barbarians, with most of that team haven played for a World XV side against Japan a week earlier.

Fixtures

Week 1

Notes:
 Uruguay awarded caps for this match.
 This was Uruguay's first ever victory over Argentina, despite it not being a full test match.

Week 2

Notes:
 Gareth Anscombe, Kristian Dacey, Dominic Day, Ross Moriarty Tyler Morgan and Eli Walker (all Wales) made their international debuts.
 Mike Ross (Ireland) earned his 50th test cap.
 No replacement was issued when Tommy O'Donnell was taken off injured in the 75th minute.

Week 3

Notes:
 Richie McCaw surpassed Ireland's Brian O'Driscoll world record as the most capped rugby player, with 142 caps.
 David Pocock (Australia) earned his 50th test cap.
 New Zealand retained the Bledisloe Cup.

Notes:
 Jack Conan, Nathan White (both Ireland), Hugh Blake and Michael Cusack (both Scotland) made their international debuts.

Notes:
 Sam Burgess, Calum Clark, Luke Cowan-Dickie and Henry Slade (England) made their international debuts.
 François Trinh-Duc (France) earned his 50th test cap.
 This was the 100th match contested between England and France.

Notes:
 Santiago García Botta (Argentina) made his international debut.

Week 4

Notes:
 This was Japan's first ever win over Uruguay.

Notes:
 Carlo Canna, Marcello Violi (both Italy), John Hardie, Damien Hoyland, Rory Hughes Stuart McInally and WP Nel (all Scotland) made their international debuts; Nel was the first Scottish Rugby Union project player to be capped.
 Grant Gilchrist was due to captain Scotland, but pulled out of the game prior to kick off due to illness. Jim Hamilton took his place in the starting XV, with hooker Kevin Bryce filling the vacated bench place.
 This Scottish win ended their six-match losing streak.

Notes:
 Jamie George (England) made his international debut.
 Frédéric Michalak became France's top point scorer with 394 points, surpassing Christophe Lamaison's record of 380.

Notes:
 Niku Kruger (United States) made his international debut.
 This win saw the United States claim their third consecutive win over Canada, setting a new record for their longest winning streak against Canada.
 41 points was the most points the United States had ever scored against Canada.

Week 5

Notes:
 Tadhg Furlong (Ireland) and Tomas Francis (Wales) made their international debuts.
 George North (Wales) earned his 50th test cap, the youngest player to do so for any nation.
 This was Ireland's first loss at home since their 24–22 loss to New Zealand during the 2013 end of year tests.

Notes:
 This was Scotland's largest winning margin over Italy of 41 points, surpassing the previous 38 point margin in 2003.
 The 48 points was also the most points scored by Scotland over Italy.

Week 6

Notes:
 Giorgi Nemsadze (Georgia) earned his 50th test cap.

Notes:
 Davit Zirakashvili (Georgia) earned his 50th test caps.

Notes:
 Florin Surugiu (Romania) earned his 50th test cap.
 Paula Kinikinilau and Johan van Heerden (Romania) made their international debuts.
 This was Tonga's first ever win over Romania.

Notes:
 Chris Wyles (United States) earned his 50th test cap.
 Taqele Naiyaravoro and Toby Smith (both Australia) made their international debuts.

See also
 2015 World Rugby Pacific Nations Cup
 2015 Rugby Championship

References

2015
Warm-up Matches
2015–16 in European rugby union
2015–16 in Japanese rugby union
2015 in Oceanian rugby union
2015 in South American rugby union
2015 in North American rugby union
2015 in South African rugby union